Jamie Michael Sterry (born 21 November 1995) is an English professional footballer who plays for  club Hartlepool United.

Career

Early career
Sterry began his career with Newcastle United, where he progressed through the youth ranks at St James' Park and signed a professional contract in July 2015. He made his Premier League debut on 15 May 2016, coming on as an 84th-minute substitute in place of Moussa Sissoko during a 5–1 home win over Tottenham Hotspur.

On 31 August 2016, he joined Coventry City on loan until January. Sterry scored his first professional goal for Coventry in an FA Cup tie against Morecambe on 6 November 2016.

On 31 January 2018, Sterry joined Crewe Alexandra on loan until the end of the season. He made his Crewe debut on 3 February 2018 at Notts County. He returned to Crewe for a further loan spell in January 2019, but the loan spell was cut short after Sterry made just one appearance (against Northampton Town on 2 March) for Crewe.

On 23 June 2020, Sterry was released by Newcastle United. He joined Northern Premier League side South Shields four months later.

Hartlepool United
On 21 December 2020, Sterry signed for National League club Hartlepool United. He made his debut for Hartlepool the following day in a 4–0 win against Stockport County. On 22 January 2021, he decided to stay with the National League club until the end of the season.

During the 2020–21 season, Sterry played predominantly at right wing back; forming a partnership with Newcastle loanee Lewis Cass. He started in the 2021 National League play-off Final for Hartlepool as they drew 1–1 with Torquay United. In the resulting penalty shoot-out, Sterry scored his penalty as Hartlepool were promoted back to League Two. Sterry described the 2020–21 season at Hartlepool as his most enjoyable year by far after his struggles with mental health earlier in his career.

On 12 July 2021, he signed a new two-year contract with Hartlepool. On 11 September 2021, Sterry scored his first Hartlepool goal in a 1–0 victory over Bristol Rovers.

Career statistics

Honours
Newcastle United
Championship: 2016–17

Hartlepool United
National League play-offs: 2021

References

External links

1995 births
Living people
English footballers
Association football defenders
Newcastle United F.C. players
Coventry City F.C. players
Crewe Alexandra F.C. players
South Shields F.C. (1974) players
Hartlepool United F.C. players
Premier League players
English Football League players
National League (English football) players